The Flockton Flyer was a children's TV series made by Southern Television for the ITV network. It was a popular programme, which ran to two series, and provided early screen appearances for upcoming actors such as Peter Duncan and Gwyneth Strong, as well as some well-known 1970s classical and situation comedy actors.

Overview

The two series follow the adventures of the Carter family, as they struggle to re-open and run the old Flockton to Lane End branch railway, closed by British Railways five years previously. At the time of production (1976) a large number of newly closed railway branch lines were being bought and preserved by local railway preservation societies, which has given rise to an extensive network of 'heritage railways' in the United Kingdom.

The railway is said to have very limited rolling stock – one locomotive (restoration of which was completed in episode 1), one passenger coach (restoration of which was completed in episode 3), a small number of freight vehicles (three are specifically mentioned and featured – an open wagon, a box van, and a tanker truck), and a hand-pumped inspection truck. Despite this plot line, large amounts of other rolling stock are regularly seen in the background of shots – multiple passenger coaches, various freight vehicles, a second steam tank locomotive (in steam) in the opening shots of episode 1, a diesel multiple unit in certain scenes, including the arrival of the Flockton Flyer to meet the road ambulance in episode 4, and a large GWR steam engine under tarpaulin sheeting at Flockton in episode 5. Although these other vehicles are not explained away in the script, there are various references to the nearby 'mainline railway' and it may perhaps be assumed that shots involving otherwise unexplained rolling stock are shots of the Flockton line meeting the mainline railway. The direct connection of the two is confirmed by the storyline of episode 5 in the first series.

Broadcast dates
There were two series, each of six episodes. Series 1 was first transmitted in spring 1977, and Series 2 followed in early 1978. Programmes were shown at 4.45 pm on Monday afternoons.

Series 1 was repeated on ITV on Friday afternoons, commencing 8 September 1978; series 2 was repeated on Friday afternoons, commencing 7 December 1979, and running into January 1980.

Both series were again repeated on The Children's Channel, on cable TV in Britain during the early 1990s. Dubbed versions of the programmes were shown on Dutch and German TV stations.

In 2010, reruns of The Flockton Flyer were shown on the now-defunct British satellite television channel Film 24.

In August & September 2015 reruns of the series were shown on UK satellite channel Talking Pictures TV.

Location

Location filming, during 1976 and 1977, was on the newly re-opened West Somerset Railway, using its engines and rolling stock.

The locomotive

The star of the show was the steam locomotive that gave the series its name. The Flockton Flyer, was, in reality, an ex-Great Western Railway 0-6-0PT ("pannier tank"): 1934-built, 6400 Class no. 6412. This class was fitted with equipment for working push-pull trains. No. 6412 was based at Gloucester loco shed and, aside from its many years of reliable operation on local branch lines, operated the last passenger train to Monmouth over the Wye Valley Railway in 1959 and the final 'Chalford Shuttle' autotrain service between Gloucester and Chalford in 1962.

After being sold into private ownership for preservation, this locomotive was one of the first on the West Somerset Railway, arriving in 1976, and taking part in the opening ceremony a few days later. It was found useful for the lighter-loaded trains on the Minehead Branch line, and also visited a number of other preserved railways.

Owned by the West Somerset Railway Association, No. 6412 remained on the heritage railway for 32 years. During that time, the success of the railway led to the use of longer and heavier trains – beyond the capability of a pannier tank – and Association members decided, reluctantly, to sell it. On 8 January 2009, part-dismantled for a major overhaul, 6412 was transferred by road to the South Devon Railway, the new owners.

The on-screen title for series 1 was "The Flockton Flyer", but for series 2 it had become "Flockton Flyer" because railway enthusiasts had pointed out that locomotive names do not take "the" before them (e.g. "Mallard" and "Flying Scotsman", not "The Mallard" and "The Flying Scotsman").

Episodes (from film and novel)

Script writer Peter Whitbread wrote a total of 17 episodes, of which 12 were filmed (6 in series one, and 6 in series two). Whitbread, who died following a road traffic accident in 2004, is best remembered as a scriptwriter, though he also acted and directed; he was not a novelist. The publication in the summer of 1977 of a Flockton Flyer children's novel appears to have been merely the adaptation of 6 storylines intended for filming, including a script with all the hallmarks of a Christmas Special edition. The novel was published by Arrow Books and Look-in Books, the latter being a trading name of a subsidiary of ITV. The novel's first and second chapters were essentially the script of filmed episode 1.1, whilst the seventh and final chapter was the script of episode 1.6; however, the other four chapters (numbered 3, 4, 5, and 6) were self-contained storylines which could have formed the basis of additional filmed episodes, but were never actually recorded. The total of 17 episodes written includes the 12 filmed, the additional 4 from the novel, and one other episode which was written in detail, with scripts and production notes issued to cast and crew, but subsequently abandoned; see below (episode 2.X) for details.

Series 1 (1977)

Series 2 (1978)

Unfilmed episodes

Characters

Regular cast
Bob Carter – David Neal
Kathy Carter – Sheila Fearn
Commander Frost – Anthony Sharp
Jimmy Carter – Peter Duncan
Jan Carter – Gwyneth Strong
Jessica Carter –  Annabelle Lanyon (Series 1); Catlin Strong (Series 2)
Bill Jelly – Geoffrey Russell
Althea Frost – Margaret Wedlake

Guest appearances
1.1 Ted Phillips (Denis Gilmore)
1.2 Joe Pratt (John Barrett)
1.3 Don Davis (Phil Daniels); Reverend Walker (Stacy Davies)
1.4 Samantha Peters (Peggyann Clifford)
1.5 Toff (Michael Ripper); Eric (Ben Howard); Diesel Driver (Steve Kelly)
1.6 Mr Jenkins (Dudley Jones)
2.1 The Duke of Flockton (Patrick Mower)
2.2 Christopher Bell (John Moulder-Brown); Nolan Cutley (Harry Fowler); Felicity (Penny Irving)
2.3 C.P.O. Potts (Colin Douglas); Farmer (Thomas Heathcote)
2.4 Master of Foxhounds (Gerald Harper); Vet (Edward Underdown)
2.5 Young Man (Christoper Douglas)
2.6 Sylvia (Illona Linthwaite)

Production notes
Written by: – Peter Whitbread
Theme Music: – Jugg Music
Film Camera: – Joe Hardy and Peter Greenhalgh (Series 1); Roy Page (Series 2)
Film Sound: – Stan Phipps
Dubbing Mixer: – Ron Hussey
Film Editor: – Christopher Wentzell (Series 1); Michael Hunt (Series 2)
Design: – John Dilly (Series 1); Gregory Lawson (Series 2)
Executive Producer: – Lewis Rudd
Producer (Series 1) and Producer/Director (Series 2): – Colin Nutley

DVD release
The rights to "The Flockton Flyer" are now held by Renown Pictures Ltd www.renownfilms.co.uk, who also hold the rights to several other Southern TV productions, including "Worzel Gummidge", "Freewheelers" and "The Famous Five".

The series was cleared for DVD release in the UK (by Simply Home Entertainment) in early 2009, and pre-orders of the two-DVD set, containing the complete Series One and Series Two, arrived with customers on the release date, 16 March 2009.

References

External links 
Flockton Flyer at Renown Pictures – "includes comprehensive plot summary (same as the one at Play.com")
IMDB entry  – "much more detail but appears to be the same plot summary again..."
BFI Film & TV Database entry – "not a lot of information here yet!" (Jan 2009)
DVD on Amazon – better picture of sleeve!
TV-Ark – download of title sequence
BBFC Classification for DVD release (PG) – includes full list of episode titles

ITV children's television shows
1977 British television series debuts
1978 British television series endings
1970s British children's television series
British children's television series
Television series about rail transport
Fictional locomotives
Television shows produced by Southern Television
English-language television shows